The 1583 Throckmorton Plot was one of a series of attempts by English Roman Catholics to depose Elizabeth I of England and replace her with Mary, Queen of Scots, then held under house arrest in England.The alleged objective was to facilitate a Spanish invasion of England, assassinate Elizabeth, and put Mary on the English throne.

The plot is named after the key conspirator, Sir Francis Throckmorton, cousin of Bess Throckmorton, lady in waiting to Queen Elizabeth. Throckmorton was arrested in November 1583 and executed on 10 July 1584.

Objectives

The plot aimed to free Mary, Queen of Scots, under house arrest in England since 1568, make her queen in place of Elizabeth and legally restore Roman Catholicism. That would be achieved by a Spanish-backed invasion of England, led by the French Duke of Guise, supported by a simultaneous revolt of English Roman Catholics. Guise would marry Mary and become king.

Guise was head of the Catholic League, a key participant in the French Wars of Religion. As one of those who planned the 1572 Bartholomew's Day massacre, he was loathed by Protestants throughout Europe and perhaps the least likely candidate for such an undertaking.

It was typical of the amateurish and overly optimistic approach of many such attempts. Throckmorton was placed under surveillance almost as soon as he returned to England, and the plot never put into action.

Events

Francis Throckmorton (1554-1584) came from a prominent English Catholic family, his father John Throckmorton being a senior judge and witness to Queen Mary's will. While travelling in Europe with his brother Thomas from 1580 to 1583, they visited Paris and met with Catholic exiles Charles Paget and Thomas Morgan.

After returning to London in 1583, Francis carried messages between Mary, Queen of Scots, Morgan and Bernardino de Mendoza, Philip II of Spain's ambassador in London. This correspondence was routed through the French embassy in London. Throckmorton also carried some letters written by Mary to the French ambassador Michel de Castelnau. An agent within the French embassy at Salisbury Court near Fleet Street notified Francis Walsingham, Elizabeth's Secretary of State.

Throckmorton was taken into custody in November, along with incriminating documents, including lists of English Catholic supporters. He was encoding a letter to Mary, Queen of Scots, when he was arrested. After a few days, he was taken to the Tower of London. Another conspirator and letter carrier, George More, was also arrested and questioned, but released after making a deal with Walsingham.

Shortly before his arrest, Throckmorton managed to send a casket of other documents to Mendoza; it has been suggested this was exactly what Walsingham wanted him to do. Throckmorton was a relatively minor player, whose significance was to confirm the extent of Spanish involvement in seeking to overthrow Elizabeth.

Protected by diplomatic immunity, Mendoza was expelled in January 1584. He was the last Spanish ambassador to England during the Elizabethan era. Throckmorton was tortured with the rack, first on 16 November, to ensure he revealed as much information as possible. On 19 November, he confessed to giving the Spanish ambassador a list of suitable havens and ports on the English coast. 

Throckmorton was put on trial on 21 May 1584 and executed on 10 July. His brother Thomas and many others managed to escape; some were imprisoned in the Tower of London but Francis Throckmorton was the only one executed.

A servant of Mary, Queen of Scots, Jérôme Pasquier, was questioned by Thomas Phelippes in September 1586. He confessed to writing a letter in cipher for Mary to send to the French ambassador Castelnau asking him to negotiate a pardon for Francis Throckmorton.

Aftermath
Mary was placed under strict confinement at Chartley Hall in Staffordshire, while Walsingham and Lord Burghley drew up the Bond of Association, obliging all signatories to execute anyone who attempted to usurp the throne or to assassinate the Queen. Mary herself was one of the signatories and it provided the basis for her execution following the 1586 Babington Plot.

Many participants in the Babington and Gunpowder Plots were related by blood or marriage to Francis, among them Robert Catesby and Francis Tresham. Bess Throckmorton (1565-1647) secretly married Sir Walter Raleigh (1554-1618).

A ballad celebrating the discovery of the plot compared Elizabeth's escape to the survival of Shadrach, Meshach, and Abednego in Nebuchadnezzar's fiery furnace.

References

Sources
 
 
 
 
 
 

1582 in England
1583 in England
History of Catholicism in England
Political history of England
Religion and politics
16th-century coups d'état and coup attempts
1583 in Christianity
16th-century anti-Protestantism

es:Trama Throckmorton#top
Tudor England